The medial inferior genicular is an artery of the leg.

Course
It first descends along the upper margin of the popliteus, to which it gives branches; it then passes below the medial condyle of the tibia, beneath the tibial collateral ligament, at the anterior border of which it ascends to the front and medial side of the joint, to supply the upper end of the tibia and the knee-joint, anastomosing with the lateral inferior and medial superior genicular arteries.

References

See also
 Patellar anastomosis

Arteries of the lower limb